The 1940 Alabama Crimson Tide football team (variously "Alabama", "UA" or "Bama") represented the University of Alabama in the 1940 college football season. It was the Crimson Tide's 47th overall and 8th season as a member of the Southeastern Conference (SEC). The team was led by head coach Frank Thomas, in his tenth year, and played their home games at Denny Stadium in Tuscaloosa and Legion Field in Birmingham, Alabama. They finished the season with a record of seven wins and two losses (7–2 overall, 4–2 in the SEC).

The Crimson Tide opened the 1940 season with three consecutive, non-conference victories over Spring Hill, Mercer and Howard. However, Alabama was defeated 27–12 by Tennessee in their conference opener in week four. The Crimson Tide then rebounded with four consecutive conference victories over Kentucky, Tulane, Georgia Tech and Vanderbilt. Alabama then closed their season with a loss against Mississippi State on homecoming at Denny Stadium.

Schedule

Game summaries

Spring Hill

Source:

To open the 1940 season, Alabama defeated Spring Hill College 26–0 at Murphy High School Stadium in Mobile. After a scoreless first quarter, the Crimson Tide scored their first touchdown on a one-yard Paul Spencer run in the second quarter and held a 7–0 halftime lead. In the third quarter, Alabama extended their lead to 20–0 with touchdowns scored runs of two-yards by Spencer and 31-yards by Dave Brown. They then closed the game with a five-yard Herschel Mosley touchdown run in the fourth quarter for the 26–0 victory. The victory was Alabama's final game played against the Badgers and improved their all-time record against Spring Hill to 3–0. This contest is also notable for being the first night game ever played by an Alabama football team.

Mercer

Source:

In their first home game of the season, Alabama shutout the Mercer Bears 20–0 on an unseasonably warm afternoon that saw temperatures in excess of 90 degrees. Paul Spencer scored both of the Crimson Tide's first half touchdowns on runs of six and five yards for a 13–0 halftime lead. The final score came in the third quarter on a six-yard Dave Brown touchdown run. In the victory, the Alabama defense only allowed the Bears one first down and held their offense to net yardage of minus 17. The victory was Alabama's final game played against the Bears until 2017 and improved their all-time record against Mercer to 2–0.

Howard

Source:

At Denny Stadium, Alabama defeated Howard (now Samford University) 31–0 for their third consecutive shutout to open the season. Paul Spencer scored first with his one-yard touchdown run in the first quarter followed by a six-yard Dave Brown touchdown run in the second quarter for a 13–0 halftime lead. After Spencer scored again in the third on a seven-yard run, Jimmy Nelson intercepted a Jimmy Tarrant pass and returned it 88-yards for a touchdown. Don Salls then scored the final points of the game in the fourth quarter on a ten-yard run for the 31–0 victory. The victory improved Alabama's all-time record against Howard to 18–0–1.

Tennessee

Source:

On the Monday prior to their annual game against the Volunteers, Tennessee was selected to the No. 5 position in the first AP Poll of the 1940 season. In the game, Alabama was defeated by rival Tennessee 27–12 before an overflow crowd of 24,500 at Legion Field. After a scoreless first quarter, Alabama took their only lead of the game early in the second quarter on a 14-yard fake reverse by Jimmy Nelson for a touchdown. The Volunteers responded with a pair of John Butler touchdowns to take a 14–6 halftime lead. The first came on an 11-yard Butler pass to Al Hurst and the second on a 19-yard Butler punt return.

Alabama then cut the lead to 14–12 in the third quarter after Dave Brown returned a Tennessee punt 57-yards for a touchdown. The Volunteers responded with a pair of fourth-quarter touchdowns to seal the victory. The first came on a five-yard Buss Warren pass to Mike Balitsaris and the second on a 24-yard Warren to Balitsaris pass. The loss brought Alabama's all-time record against Tennessee to 13–8–2.

Kentucky

Source:

On what was homecoming for Kentucky, the Crimson Tide shutout the Wildcats 25–0 at Lexington. After a scoreless first, Alabama started their first scoring drive of the game after Joe Domnanovich recovered a Kentucky fumble to give the Crimson Tide possession at the Wildcats' ten-yard line. Dave Brown then scored on a one-yard run for a 7–0 lead. Jimmy Nelson scored later in the quarter on a 63-yard touchdown run to give Alabama a 13–0 halftime lead. The Crimson Tide then closed the game with a pair of second half touchdowns for the 25–0 victory. The first came on a 39-yard Nelson run in the third and on a 40-yard Don Salls interception return in the fourth. The victory improved Alabama's all-time record against Kentucky 18–1–1.

Tulane

Source:

In Birmingham, the Crimson Tide defeated the Green Wave 13–6 before a crowd of 20,000 at Legion Field. After a scoreless first, Alabama took a 6–0 halftime lead when Paul Spencer scored a touchdown on a short run after Holt Rast recovered a fumbled punt at the Tulane three-yard line. Early in the third quarter, Dave Brown extended the Alabama lead to 13–0 with his 12-yard touchdown run. Tulane did start a comeback in the fourth quarter with a touchdown, but was stopped late in the game when Ed Hickerson intercepted a Harry Hays pass at the Alabama eight-yard line to seal the Crimson Tide win. The victory improved Alabama's all-time record against Tulane to 13–4–1.

Georgia Tech

Source:

Prior to their final road game of the season against Georgia Tech, Alabama entered the AP Poll for the first time of the season at No. 14. Against the Yellow Jackets, the Crimson Tide won on a missed extra point 14–13 at Grant Field. Tech scored first on a nine-yard J. W. Bosch touchdown pass to R. L. Ison; however, C. P. Goree missed the extra point that would later prove to be the final margin of loss. Alabama responded on the kickoff that ensued when Jimmy Nelson scored on a 94-yard touchdown return. Each team then traded third-quarter touchdowns. Alabama scored first on a short Paul Spencer run followed by a C. R. Bates touchdown pass to G. I. Webb. The victory improved Alabama's all-time record against Georgia Tech to 12–11–3.

Vanderbilt

Source:

As a result of their unexpectedly close contest against Georgia Tech, Alabama dropped three spots to the No. 17 position in the AP Poll prior to their game against Vanderbilt. In their game against the Commodores, Alabama rallied from a 14–0 deficit to defeat Vanderbilt 25–21 in the final Legion Field game of the 1940 season. The Commodores took a 14–0 halftime lead with touchdowns scored in the first on a 39-yard Charlton Davis pass to Binks Bushmiaer and in the second on a six-yard George Marlin run. Alabama responded in the third quarter with a pair of touchdowns to cut the lead to 14–13. Touchdowns were scored on a 12-yard Jimmy Nelson pass to Hal Newman and on a short Dave Brown run. In the fourth, Vanderbilt extended their lead to 21–13 with an Art Rebrovich touchdown run, but ten gave up a pair of late touchdowns to give Alabama the 25–21 win. Alabama's final touchdowns were scored on a pair of Nelson passes, first to Holt Rast and the second to Russ Craft for the win. The victory improved Alabama's all-time record against Vanderbilt to 13–9.

Mississippi State

Source:

In the final game of the season, Alabama was shutout 13–0 against the Mississippi State Maroons on homecoming at Denny Stadium. The Maroons scored both of their touchdowns on runs of nine-yards by Harvey Johnson in the first quarter and 23-yards by Charles Yancey in the fourth quarter. The loss brought Alabama's all-time record against Mississippi State to 19–6–2.

After the season

NFL Draft
Several players that were varsity lettermen from the 1940 squad were drafted into the National Football League (NFL) between the 1941 and 1943 drafts. These players included the following:

Personnel

Varsity letter winners

Coaching staff

References
General

 

Specific

Alabama
Alabama Crimson Tide football seasons
Alabama Crimson Tide football